Samuel King Thompson (February 20, 1885 – death date unknown) was an American Negro league catcher between 1908 and 1911.

A native of Kentucky, Thompson made his Negro leagues debut in 1908 with the Indianapolis ABCs, and played for Indianapolis again in 1910 and 1911.

References

External links
 and Seamheads

1885 births
Year of death missing
Place of death missing
Indianapolis ABCs players
Baseball catchers
Baseball players from Kentucky